Derech Chaim ("The Way of Life") is a work on the subject of repentance by the second Rebbe of the Chabad Hasidic movement, Rabbi Dovber Schneuri.

Topics discussed

"Resurrection from sin" 
In Derech Chaim, Rabbi Schneuri interprets the second blessing in the Jewish Shemoneh Esreh prayer ("Blessed are You, God, Who revives the dead") as referring to two sets of resurrections. One of the messianic era (following the traditional interpretation) as well as a present resurrection of the souls of the wicked. Rabbi Schneuri, citing the Talmud, states that the wicked are termed "dead" even during their lifetime, however, through repentance those who have sinned may renew their connection with God and are "returned to life". The blessing therefore refers to the idea of resurrection in both present and future tenses.

Two types of orphans 
Rabbi Schneuri employs the analogy of two types of orphans, one whose father has died, the other who has no mother, to describe those who commit particular deeds which damage the soul's spiritual "sight" or "hearing" (which Rabbi Schneuri calls the "father and mother" components of the soul). Interpreting the verse "When my father and my mother forsake me, then the Lord will take me up," Rabbi Schneuri describes the former sinner drawing inspiration from God who comforts the "orphan" repentant.

Call for study
In 1956, the seventh Chabad rebbe, Rabbi Menachem Mendel Schneerson, encouraged yeshiva students to study Derech Chaim and other works on the subject of Teshuva during the month of Elul, a time of the year associated with repentance due to its proximity to the Jewish High Holy Days.

Rabbi Shalom Dovber  
Rabbi Yosef Yitzchak Schneersohn, the sixth Chabad Rebbe, recounted an episode involving his father, Rabbi Sholom Dovber Schneersohn, the fifth Rebbe, and the book Derech Chaim. Rabbi Yosef Yitzchak observed his father and a number of his followers engaged in an ecstatic gathering; Rabbi Sholom Dovber was surrounded by his followers and held the book Derech Chaim and sang the Niggun (Hasidic wordless melody) "Hiney Ma Tov Umanayim."

Publication
Derech Chaim was originally published in Kapust, in 1819, during the lifetime of Rabbi Dovber. The work was later reprinted a number of times by the central Chabad publishing house, Kehot Publication Society, beginning in 1947.

See also
 Chabad philosophy
 Rabbi Dovber Schneuri

References

External links
 Full Hebrew text of Derech Chaim on HebrewBooks.org
 English translation of Derech Chaim by Shimon Markel on TrueKabbalah.com

Chabad-Lubavitch texts
Hasidic literature
1819 non-fiction books
1955 non-fiction books